Miles is a 2016 American comedy-drama film starring Tim Boardman as the titular character.

Cast 
 Tim Boardman as Miles Walton
 Molly Shannon as Pam Walton
 Missi Pyle as Leslie Wayne
 Paul Reiser as Lloyd Bryant
 Stephen Root as Ron Walton
 Yeardley Smith as Mrs. Armstrong
 Annie Golden as Rhonda Roth
 Ethan Phillips as Mr. Wilson
 Malcolm Gets as Timothy Schultz

Reception 
, the film holds an approval rating of 64% on Rotten Tomatoes, based on 11 reviews with an average rating of 6.6/10. Nayanika Kapoor of Common Sense Media awarded the film three stars out of five.

References

External links 
 
 

American comedy-drama films
American LGBT-related films
LGBT-related comedy-drama films
2016 LGBT-related films
2016 comedy films
2016 drama films
2010s English-language films
2010s American films